Poverty, Inc. is a 91-minute documentary inquiry into the nature of human flourishing and the effects of the multibillion dollar poverty industrial complex erected to promote it. The film challenges current perceptions of global charity and promotes entrepreneurship as an effective alternative to alleviating world poverty. The film was made by the Acton Institute, a free market think tank.

Production and synopsis

The filming started in 2010. Directed by Michael Matheson Miller and drawing from over 200 interviews filmed in 20 countries, Poverty, Inc. explores the neocolonial power dynamics embedded paternalism underpinning the predominant modes of assistance, which often situate “the poor” (i.e. “the other”) as the objects of charity rather than as the active protagonists in their own stories.

The film has the tag-line, “Fighting poverty is big business, but who profits the most?” One of the things the film looks at is charitable institutions and their role in fighting poverty. It questions whether aid institutions themselves are sometimes a hindrance to fighting poverty. The film features Herman Chinery-Hesse, Hernando de Soto and Nobel Peace Prize winner Mohammad Yunus. Also mentioned in the film are Bill Clinton and Bono. A significant proportion of the film focuses on the unintended consequences of a policy to subsidize rice exports from the US to Haiti under the Clinton Administration in the 1990s, which he later admitted was a failure.

Critical reception

Peter Debruge of Variety wrote, "As if poverty weren't a challenging enough phenomenon unto itself, time has revealed that good intentions by outsiders can in many cases make the problem worse – a cruel irony that serves as the basis of Michael Matheson Miller’s Poverty Inc., an easy-to-understand docu-essay with a tough-to-accept message, especially as it implies that some aid organizations may actually be cashing in on their concern." And about the director: "Miller avoids the manipulative tricks of lesser filmmakers, presenting his argument with lucidity and reason. Whereas others give without thinking, Poverty Inc. provides genuine food for thought."

Jessi Cape of the Austin Chronicle wrote, "This is a not a sappy documentary – it is all about data: tax loopholes, jobs, geopolitics, property rights, gender issues, rule of law, and much else."

Justice Network, an anti-human trafficking NGO, commented, "It's a raw look at what we're doing wrong and what could be done right."

Economist Jose Caraballo-Cueto wrote in the Huffington Post that the film relies heavily on anecdotes, committing "what economists call the fallacy of composition." The film was also critiqued for conflating foreign aid, NGO work, and the work of international development organizations, blurring the distinction between charity and support for development.

In reviewing the film, Jeff Bloem argues: "It is exceedingly dangerous to only consider aid spending that has not lead to the reduction of poverty while disregarding the aid spending that actually does produce worthwhile results" and cites the eradication of smallpox as an example of successful aid efforts.

Awards 
Anthem Film Festival
 FreedomFest Grand Prize
 Documentary Feature, Excellence in Filmmaking
 Audience Choice Award, Feature length
Bahamas International Film Festival
  Best Documentary
Chagrin Documentary Film Fest
 Emerging Filmmaker Award
Docutah Film Festival
 Best Picture
FirstGlance Film Festival Philadelphia
 Emerging Filmmaker Award

Official selection 
 Austin Film Festival 2014
 Chicago International Social Change Film Festival 2014
 Leeds Film Festival
 San Luis Obispo International Film Festival
  Thessaloniki Documentary Film Festival
 World Unite Film Festival
 Afrika Film Festival – Leuven 2016

See also
 The Call of the Entrepreneur

References

External links 
 
 Poverty, Inc. at IMDb

2014 documentary films
Documentary films about poverty
Libertarian publications
2014 films
2010s English-language films